Bad Timing is a 1980 British psychological drama film directed by Nicolas Roeg and starring Art Garfunkel, Theresa Russell, Harvey Keitel, and Denholm Elliott. The plot focuses on an American woman and a psychology professor living in Vienna, and, largely told through nonlinear flashbacks, examines the details of their turbulent relationship as uncovered by a detective investigating her apparent suicide attempt.

The film was controversial upon its release, being branded "a sick film made by sick people for sick people" by its own distributor, the Rank Organisation, and was given an X rating in the United States. It went unreleased on home video in the United States until 2005 when The Criterion Collection released their DVD edition.

Plot
In Cold War Vienna, Milena Flaherty, a young American woman in her 20s, is rushed to the emergency room after apparently overdosing in a suicide attempt. With her is Alex Linden, an American psychoanalyst who lives in the city working as a university teacher. While doctors and nurses fight to save Milena's life, an investigator, Netusil, begins investigating the incident. Through fragmented flashbacks, the narrative depicts the story of Alex and Milena's romance.

After meeting her at a party, Alex is enchanted by Milena, a sophisticated but free-spirited military brat. The two begin a whirlwind affair, but shortly into the relationship, Milena is revealed to suffer from severe depression and is married to a much older man, Stefan, whom she occasionally visits across the border in Bratislava. Though Alex initially enjoys Milena's free-spirited lifestyle, he soon becomes embittered by it, as it includes impulsive promiscuity and heavy drinking. Alex begins stalking Milena, and eventually confronts her about her marriage to Stefan. She insists that the marriage is simply platonic, and that she and Stefan are no longer in love. Despite this, Alex begins researching into Stefan's past, and inquires with local government agencies about how Milena can proceed with a divorce, which she refuses.

Alex's jealousy of Milena only continues to grow, and he begins to resent her. After one argument, Milena forcefully impels Alex to have sex with her to sate him, and is disgusted with herself after. In one incident, when the couple vacation in Morocco, their vehicle breaks down, and they hitch a ride from two Moroccan men. Alex is left in the bed of the truck, while Milena sits between the two men, flirting with them during the drive, which Alex keenly observes. Upon arriving in Ouarzazate, Alex suggests that he and Milena return to the United States where he can take a teaching position in New York City, but she insists that they live "in the moment."

Milena begins to question her and Alex's romance when she finds evidence that he has been treating her as a case study. Later, Alex confronts her about a photograph in her apartment that he has obsessed over, which shows her at a lake with another man. She tells him the photo is of her and her brother, taken in California years prior, but Alex does not believe her. The following morning, Alex confronts a drunken Milena outside her apartment, telling her he cannot bear the thought of her with another man. When she defiantly renounces him, he slaps her. Later, Milena invites him back to her apartment, only to taunt him in kabuki makeup, mockingly presenting herself as the "new Milena." When he storms out, Milena screams at him from her window, hurling objects at him onto the street below. The following night, Milena leaves Alex a drunken voice message suggesting she wants to die.

In the present, as doctors attempt to revive the dying Melina, Netusil pieces together the chain of events, culminating in an interview with Alex, who presents himself simply as Milena's friend. Uncovering timeline inconsistencies in Alex's story, Netusil determines what actually occurred: Alex, after finding Milena overdosing on poison in her apartment, looked on as she slowly collapsed, and subsequently raped her once she lost consciousness. Though Netusil has physical evidence suggesting Milena was raped, he is unable to elicit a confession from Alex. Stefan arrives, and reveals Milena has survived the overdose following a life-saving tracheotomy. Alex departs without repercussion, but, before he leaves, Stefan comments that he must love Milena more than his own dignity.

Some time later, in New York, Alex sees Milena passing by in front of the Waldorf-Astoria hotel as he enters a taxi. He calls out to her, and she briefly turns toward him, revealing her tracheotomy scar, before impassively walking away.

Cast

Production
The film was one of the series of movies greenlit by Tony Williams at the Rank Organisation, who were increasing their production output. Rank made eight films over two years, being mostly conservative choices such as the 1978 film The Thirty-Nine Steps, the third adaptation of the 1915 novel. Bad Timing was the most unusual of the slate of films. While Art Garfunkel was making the film, his girlfriend, Laurie Bird, committed suicide in New York.

Release
Bad Timing was first shown at the Berlin International Film Festival in February 1980, and premiered in London on 10 April 1980.

The film was later shown at the Toronto International Film Festival on 12 September 1980, and was screened in New York City on 22 September, with a theatrical release in the United States on 25 October 1980.

Critical reaction
The film received mixed reviews. Some found it brilliant; others, tasteless. At the UK premiere, film critic David Robinson in The Times praised Nicolas Roeg as "a director of panache and individuality, and with an ability to fascinate and compel the attention," and wrote about the unusual editing and the carefully staged scenes: "In other hands all this might only be deception and distraction, but through these fragmented elements Roeg and his ingenious writer Yale Udoff creates a perfectly coherent and intriguing central narrative and relationship." Its UK distributor, Rank, were appalled by what they saw; one executive called it "a sick film made by sick people for sick people". In response, they removed the Rank logo from all UK prints of the film. John Coleman in the New Statesman gave it a very bad review: "[it has] an overall style which plays merry hell with chronology".

On review aggregator Rotten Tomatoes the film has a score of 46% based on reviews from 13 critics, with an average rating of 7 out of 10.

The film received the Toronto Festival of Festivals's highest honour, the People's Choice Award, in 1980, as well as the London Film Critics Circle Award for Best Director.

Legacy
The film's title was used by musician Jim O'Rourke for his album Bad Timing, the first in a trilogy of albums which O'Rourke named after films Nicolas Roeg had made during the nineteen-eighties – the other two being Eureka (O'Rourke's 1999 album, title taken from Eureka, Roeg's 1983 film) and Insignificance (O'Rourke's 2001 album, title taken from Insignificance, Roeg's 1985 film). The film Bad Timing was also a partial inspiration for The Glove's 1983 album Blue Sunshine, a side project of The Cure's Robert Smith and Siouxsie and the Banshees' Steven Severin. According to Smith, the song "Piggy in the Mirror" from The Cure's 1984 album The Top was also inspired by the film. The film is also mentioned in the lyrics of "Return", a song from The Cure's 1996 album Wild Mood Swings.

The film received only a limited release in the US, showing for a brief period in theaters. Due to the notoriety and poor box office results, the film was not initially released on home video in the United States. However, the television rights were acquired by the Los Angeles-based pay cable network "Z Channel" and aired in heavy rotation, allowing the film to obtain cult status in the 1980s. Fragments of the film were featured on "Z Channel: Magnificent Obsession" documentary, which for years was the only way for Americans to see the film.

On 20 September 2005 the film was released on DVD by the Criterion Collection. This was the first time that the film received official home video release in the United States.

References

Sources

External links
 
 
 
 Bad Timing and Dreaming My Dreams with You an essay by Glenn Kenny at the Criterion Collection
 Bad Timing at BehaveNet Movies

1980 films
American nonlinear narrative films
American psychological drama films
American erotic thriller films
American neo-noir films
American mystery thriller films
British erotic thriller films
British nonlinear narrative films
British psychological drama films
British mystery thriller films
1980s psychological drama films
1980s mystery thriller films
1980s erotic thriller films
Films about stalking
Films about rape
Films directed by Nicolas Roeg
Films set in Vienna
Films shot in London
Films shot in Vienna
Films shot in New York City
Films shot in Morocco
Films produced by Jeremy Thomas
British neo-noir films
1980 drama films
1980s English-language films
1980s American films
1980s British films
Toronto International Film Festival People's Choice Award winners